Woodland Mills is a city in Obion County, Tennessee, United States. The population was 378 at the 2010 census. It is part of the Union City, TN–KY Micropolitan Statistical Area.

Geography
Woodland Mills is located at  (36.475326, -89.112452).

Demographics

As of the census of 2000, there were 296 people, 118 households, and 92 families residing in the city. The racial makeup of the city was 91.22% White, 7.77% African American, 0.34% Asian, and 0.68% from two or more races. Hispanic or Latino of any race were 1.01% of the population.

There were 118 households, out of which 33.1% had children under the age of 18 living with them, 66.1% were married couples living together, 8.5% had a female householder with no husband present, and 21.2% were non-families. 20.3% of all households were made up of individuals, and 10.2% had someone living alone who was 65 years of age or older. The average household size was 2.51 and the average family size was 2.86.

In the city, the population was spread out, with 22.3% under the age of 18, 9.1% from 18 to 24, 29.7% from 25 to 44, 26.4% from 45 to 64, and 12.5% who were 65 years of age or older. The median age was 38 years. For every 100 females, there were 81.6 males. For every 100 females age 18 and over, there were 87.0 males.

The median income for a household in the city was $46,875, and the median income for a family was $51,250. Males had a median income of $37,125 versus $22,500 for females. The per capita income for the city was $19,103. About 5.2% of families and 4.5% of the population were below the poverty line, including none of those under the age of eighteen and 5.8% of those 65 or over.

Media
Radio Stations
 WENK-AM 1240 - "The Greatest Hits of All Time"
 WWGY 99.3 - "Today's Best Music with Ace & TJ in the Morning"

References

Cities in Obion County, Tennessee
Cities in Tennessee
Union City, Tennessee micropolitan area
1968 establishments in Tennessee